Asplenium schizotrichum is a species of spleenwort that is endemic to the island of Rarotonga in the Cook Islands. Its population is estimated to be less than 20 mature individuals.

References

schizotrichum
Critically endangered plants
Endemic flora of the Cook Islands